Monte Carlo is a 1921 German silent film directed by Fred Sauer and starring Friedrich Zelnik and Ressel Orla. It premiered at the Marmorhaus in Berlin.

Cast
In alphabetical order
Olga Engl
Richard Georg
Fred Goebel
Poldi Müller
Ressel Orla
Alfred Schmasow
Fritz Schulz
Marie von Buelow
Frederic Zelnik

References

External links

Films of the Weimar Republic
Films directed by Fred Sauer
German silent feature films
German black-and-white films